Omega fatty acid may refer to:

 Omega-3 fatty acid
 Omega-6 fatty acid
 Omega-7 fatty acid
 Omega-9 fatty acid